Okocimski KS Brzesko is a Polish football club based in Brzesko, Poland.  The club is currently playing in the Polish II Liga, the third level division in Polish football. In the 1994/95 season the club achieved its best league performance by finishing 4th in the I Liga, the second level division,  and just missed out on promotion to the Ekstraklasa.

Current squad 
As of 22 August, 2013.

Notable players
Had international caps for Poland.
  Dariusz Żuraw (1996–1997)

References

External links
 Official website

Association football clubs established in 1933
Brzesko County
Football clubs in Lesser Poland Voivodeship
1933 establishments in Poland